is a Japanese football player who play as Defender. He is currently playing for Machida Zelvia.

Club career
Ota began his footballing career with Yokohama FC in 2006, before a move to J1 League side Shimizu S-Pulse in 2009. 85 league appearances and two goals later, Ota joined FC Tokyo in 2012. He remained in Tokyo for three years before leaving Japanese football for the first time as he completed a transfer to Eredivisie team Vitesse. He participated in 28 matches in all competitions during 2015–16 and 2016–17 prior to returning to FC Tokyo and Japan after struggling to adapt to life in the Netherlands.

Ota's debut for Perth Glory in 2021 was as a substitute against Brisbane Roar, in which he contributed two assists.

On 18 July 2022, Ota signed to J2 club, Machida Zelvia for during mid 2022 season.

International career
In July 2007, Ota was elected Japan U-20 national team for 2007 U-20 World Cup. At this tournament, he played 1 match as left side back against Nigeria.

He made his full international debut for Japan on January 6, 2010, in a 2011 Asian Cup qualification against Yemen.

Career statistics

Club
.

1Includes Japanese Super Cup.

International

References

External links

 
 
 
 

1987 births
Living people
Association football people from Tokyo
Japanese footballers
Japan youth international footballers
Japan international footballers
J1 League players
J2 League players
Eredivisie players
Yokohama FC players
Shimizu S-Pulse players
FC Tokyo players
SBV Vitesse players
Nagoya Grampus players
Perth Glory FC players
FC Machida Zelvia players
2015 AFC Asian Cup players
Expatriate footballers in the Netherlands
Association football defenders